Teramo Canevari (1511–1592) was an Italian nobleman, merchant, notary, and treasurer of the Republic of Genoa.

Biography 

Teramo was the son of Matteo Canevari (a merchant of silk industry). His wife was Pellegrina Borsona, and were parents of Demetrio Canevari, Giovanni Matteo and Ottaviano Canevari. 

The origin of Canevari family, has its roots in his grandfather's Demetrio Scordari, young merchant who in mid 15th century, had been captured by Turkish pirates in Lemnos. After years of living in Constantinople, Scordari return to their homeland, and was married to daughter of Matteo Canevaro (descendant of a noble family of Rapallo). All descendants of Demetrio Scordari used the surname Canevari.

References

External links 
www.fondazionecanevari.it

1511 births
1592 deaths
16th-century Italian nobility
16th-century Genoese people